The Estonian Social Democratic Independence Party (ESDIP) was a social democratic political party in Estonia (then the Estonian SSR), which advocated Estonian independence. The party was founded in May 1990. The party was led by Marju Lauristin.

On September 8, 1989, the party merged into the Estonian Social Democratic Party.

References

Socialist parties in Estonia
Singing Revolution
Defunct political parties in Estonia
Political parties established in 1990
Social democratic parties in Europe
1990 establishments in Estonia
1996 disestablishments in Estonia
Pro-independence parties in the Soviet Union
Social democratic parties in the Soviet Union